In mathematics, the quotient (also called Serre quotient or Gabriel quotient) of an abelian category  by a Serre subcategory  is the abelian category  which, intuitively, is obtained from  by ignoring (i.e. treating as zero) all objects from .

Forming Serre quotients of abelian categories is thus formally akin to forming quotients of groups. Serre quotients are somewhat similar to quotient categories, the difference being that with Serre quotients all involved categories are abelian and all functors are exact. Serre quotients also often have the character of localizations of categories, especially if the Serre subcategory is localizing.

Definition 

 

The canonical functor  sends an object X to itself and a morphism  to the corresponding element of the direct limit with X′ = X and Y′ = 0.

This is a multiplicative system in the sense of Gabriel-Zisman, and one can localize the category  at the system  to obtain .

Examples 
This has the effect of identifying all finite-dimensional vector spaces with 0, and of identifying two linear maps whenever their difference has finite-dimensional image. This example shows that the Serre quotient can behave like a quotient category.

For another example, take the abelian category Ab of all abelian groups and the Serre subcategory of all torsion abelian groups. Here, the Serre quotient behaves like a localization.

Properties 
The Serre quotient  is an abelian category, and the canonical functor  is exact and surjective on objects.

if and only if 

Theorems involving Serre quotients

Serre's description of coherent sheaves on a projective scheme 
According to a theorem by Jean-Pierre Serre, the category  of coherent sheaves on a projective scheme  (where  is a commutative noetherian graded ring, graded by the non-negative integers and generated by degree-0 and finitely many degree-1 elements, and  refers to the Proj construction) can be described as the Serre quotient

Gabriel–Popescu theorem 

Quillen's localization theorem 
Quillen proved that, if  is a Serre subcategory of the abelian category , there is a long exact sequence of the form

References

Category theory